Frank Ogilvie Horton (October 18, 1882 – August 17, 1948) was a United States representative from Wyoming. Born in Muscatine, Iowa, he attended the public schools, graduated from Morgan Park Military Academy (in Illinois) in 1899 and from the University of Chicago in 1903. During the Spanish–American War he served as a private in Company C, Fiftieth Iowa Regiment in 1898; he moved to Saddlestring, Wyoming, in 1905 and engaged in livestock raising. He was a member of the Wyoming House of Representatives from 1921 to 1923, and served in the Wyoming State Senate from 1923 to 1931, being its president in 1931.

Horton was a delegate to the Republican National Conventions in 1928 and 1936, and was a Republican National committeeman from 1937 to 1948. He was elected as a Republican to the Seventy-sixth Congress, serving from January 3, 1939 to January 3, 1941. He was an unsuccessful candidate for reelection in 1940 to the Seventy-seventh Congress, and resumed his former pursuits in Saddlestring as the Owner and operator of the HF Bar Ranch. He died in Sheridan, Wyoming; interment was in Willowgrove Cemetery, Buffalo, Wyoming.

References
 

1882 births
1948 deaths
People from Muscatine, Iowa
University of Chicago alumni
American military personnel of the Spanish–American War
Republican Party members of the Wyoming House of Representatives
Presidents of the Wyoming Senate
Republican Party Wyoming state senators
Ranchers from Wyoming
Republican Party members of the United States House of Representatives from Wyoming
People from Johnson County, Wyoming
20th-century American politicians